Diving at the 2005 Islamic Solidarity Games was held in Swimming Pool of the General Presidency for Youth Welfare, King Abdullah Sport City, Jeddah from April 10 to April 11, 2005. Malaysia won both gold medals.

Medalists

Medal table

References
 Results

External links
  kooora.com

2005 Islamic Solidarity Games
Islamic Solidarity Games
2005